The Air Creation Racer is a French single-seat, weight-shift control ultralight trike that was built by Air Creation of Aubenas between 1986 and 2010. It was available in kit form for amateur construction or as a completed aircraft.

Design and development
The Racer was developed as a lightweight trike that can qualify for the US FAR 103 Ultralight Vehicles category, including its  maximum empty weight requirement, when equipped with a light wing and engine.

The carriage is of aluminium construction and incorporates suspension on all three wheels. The nosewheel-mounted drum brake is foot-pedal actuated. The nosewheel is also steerable and features a mudguard. The carriage features baggage stowage pockets and optionally a cockpit fairing and wheel pants. The carriage can be equipped with several different wings. When fitted with the Air Creation Fun 14 40% double surface wing, the aircraft version is called the Fun Racer.

By 2011 the Rotax 447 and 503 were out of production and Air Creation offered a version of the Racer without an included engine so that the owner could locate a used 447, 503 or other suitable powerplant. The estimated assembly time from the supplied kit is 40 hours.

Reviewer Andre Cliche said of the Racer, "Quick and agile, the Fun Racer shows all the refinement expected from European trikes...This is a well engineered trike and company support is excellent."

Variants
Fun Racer
Racer carriage equipped with the Fun 14 wing. This wing provides docile handling and ease of rigging. Standard empty weight of  when equipped with the Rotax 447 engine.
XP Racer
Racer carriage equipped with the XP11 racing wing, giving a  cruise speed. Standard empty weight of  when equipped with the Rotax 503 engine.

Specifications (Fun Racer)

See also

References

External links

1980s French ultralight aircraft
Ultralight trikes
Racer